Tennesseellum gollum is a species of spider in the family Linyphiidae. The species is named after the fictional character Gollum from the  works of J. R. R. Tolkien, in reference to "the 'evil look' of the male of this species due to the large cheliceral tubercles." Native to the Southwestern United States, it was described based on an individual collected in Anza-Borrego Desert State Park, Southern California.

References

Linyphiidae
Spiders described in 2013
Spiders of the United States
Fauna of the Southwestern United States
Organisms named after Tolkien and his works